Ormond Quay Presbyterian Church is a former church located at Ormond Quay, Dublin.

There was a congregation of Presbyterians, many of Scottish extraction, in Dublin around Ormond Quay since the early 18th century, a Mr. Arbuckle being the first minister. It was first established in 1707 in Ushers Quay after a split within the congregation of Bull Alley. The congregation from the Plunket Street Meeting House(Presbyterian church) merged with Usher's quay in 1844.

The construction of the church was financed by a bequest from a widow, Martha Maria Magee (née Stewart) from Lurgan, County Armagh, who had moved to Dublin. She had inherited a large sum of money from her brothers, both soldiers. The church was designed by architect Edward P. Gribbon and erected in 1847. It was enlarged to the design of the same architect in 1859.

In 1938 the Ormond Quay congregation merged with the Abbey Street congregation. Ormond Quay became the home of the Dublin City Mission of the Presbyterian Church in Ireland until the late 1940s when it was acquired by Dublin Corporation under compulsory purchase.

In the 1960s the church building was damaged by fire, and the upper section was removed by Dublin Corporation. In 1989 the ground floor facade was incorporated into a new office building erected on the site called Grattan Bridge House at 3 Ormond Quay Upper.

In 2003, the Ormond Quay and Scots Church voted to merge with the Clontarf Presbyterian Church, sanctioned by the General Assembly to create the Clontarf & Scots Presbyterian Church, and they moved to Clontarf, Dublin.

References

External links 
 Irish Architecture site with images

Former churches in the Republic of Ireland
Presbyterian churches in Dublin (city)
Demolished buildings and structures in Dublin